Lemyra imparilis is a moth of the family Erebidae. It was described by Arthur Gardiner Butler in 1877. It is found in China (Guangdong, Liaonin, Hebei, Shandong, Jiangxi, Hunan, Fujian, Beijing), Taiwan, Japan and Korea.

References

 

imparilis
Moths described in 1877